Movement 21 (D21) is a political party in Bulgaria established in 2011, led by Tatyana Doncheva.

History 
In April 2010, Tatyana Doncheva, a former BSP deputy and member of the party's National Council, presented her new Movement 21 (D21) project, which she plans to set up as a civic association to be established as a non-governmental organization, and within a few months later became a political party. In 2011 it was established as a political party.

Elections 
 Presidential elections
In the presidential elections in 2016, the party formed a coalition with the National Movement for Stability and Progress (NDSV), with presidential candidate - Tatyana Doncheva and vice presidential candidate - Mincho Spasov. They received 69,372 actual votes, or 1.81% support, with 57.47% turnout.

 Parliamentary elections
In the parliamentary elections in 2017, the party formed a coalition with Alternative for Bulgarian Revival (ABV), together receiving 54,412 actual votes, or 1.59% support, with 54.07% turnout.

In the April 2021 parliamentary elections, the party was part of the Stand Up! Mafia, Get Out! coalition which received 4,64% of the popular vote and 14 seats in the National Assembly.

 European Parliament elections
In the 2019 European elections, the party received 4,141 actual votes, or 0.21% support, with 32.64% turnout.

 Local elections
In the local elections in 2015, the party won 25 municipal councilors, in the municipalities - Blagoevgrad, Garmen, Petrich, Lom, Sopot, Vidin, Tvarditsa, Sofia, etc.

See also 

 List of political parties in Bulgaria

References

External links 
 
 

2011 establishments in Bulgaria
Social democratic parties in Bulgaria